Robert Oswald Milne (10 September 1852 – 6 September 1927) was an English cricketer active in 1882 who played for Lancashire. He was born in Prestwich and died in Leamington Spa. He appeared in one first-class match and scored seven runs with a highest score of 7*.

Notes

1852 births
1927 deaths
English cricketers
Lancashire cricketers